Kenmore West Senior High School (nicknamed Ken-West) is one of two public high schools in the Kenmore-Town of Tonawanda School District.  The other is Kenmore East Senior High School.

History

Founding 
In 1938, a WPA grant of about $700,000 was received from the federal government toward the creation of a separate building for the senior high school on Highland Parkway, and the school district provided over $1M in additional funds. The  plot on which the school is situated cost $35,000. The school opened in the fall of 1940 with fifty faculty members and 1,250 pupils. In 1959, Kenmore East High School was opened as the district continued to grow. At that time, the Highland Parkway school officially became Kenmore West High School. Raymond Stewart Frazier (1901–1998) was appointed of principal of Kenmore West in 1952.

History of the land 
The  plot is part of what used to be the Philip Pirson homestead, a 75-acre farm.

Building expansion and additions 
The community continued to grow in the subsequent years, requiring a classroom addition to the west wing of school in 1967–1968. In the late 1990s, the school district proposed building a new library information center on the west lawn and an athletic complex east of the original gymnasium.  Voters narrowly approved funding for the projects in 1997. The additions were designed by Duchscherer Oberst Design, P.C., an architectural firm in Buffalo.  Joseph L. Kopec was the lead architect.  The library was completed at a cost of about $10 million in the fall of 2000. The design won an award for educational architecture in the summer of 2001.

Another capital enhancement to the building occurred after a May 2002 fire in the cafeteria bay, causing a multi-month relocation of the cafeteria to the Old Gym while a new cafeteria was erected, opening January 31, 2003, to an appreciative student body.

Enrollment and leadership 
Kenmore West's enrollment grew steadily through about 1970, and reached its peak in 1969 with over 3000 students in grades 10, 11 and 12. Alan Hammon MacGamwell (1926–2004), a 1944 graduate of the school, was appointed its third principal in 1971, after serving as a teacher, coach and assistant principal in the Ken-Ton Schools. In that era, the school boasted large numbers of National Merit Scholarship winners. In 1969, Kenmore West, under coach Jules Yakapovich, won the Niagara Frontier League Football Championship and drew national attention as theoretical national champions, determined statistically by a computer match-up with a Florida high school team.

MacGamwell retired in 1980 and served the Ken-Ton District on the Board of Education. Another Kenmore graduate, Charles Kristich, class of 1955, succeeded him as principal that year. Douglas H. Smith became Principal in December 1994 and led the 9–12 school building until December 2005.  Karen Geelan, former Assistant Principal in the West Seneca School district, was hired as the Principal of grades 9 and 10, and Smith would continue to lead grades 11 and 12. In 2007, Geelan became Lead Principal of the building under Smith's tutelage until he transferred to Benjamin Franklin Middle School in 2008 where he was Principal until his retirement in 2010.  Geelan earned an educational doctorate from the University of Buffalo in 2011 and left Kenmore West in June of that year to become the Superintendent of Allegheny Limestone Central Schools. Dean R. Johnson, who had been a Kenmore West Assistant Principal from 2008 to 2011, succeeded Geelan in 2011 as principal of Kenmore West. Kayla Capuccio, Kelly Lambert, and Denise Grandits are currently assistant principals. Ken Belote is the schools Athletic Coordinator.

Declining population 
The Kenmore community, like the rest of Western New York, lost population between 1970 and 1990. Enrollment of Kenmore West dipped to a low of under 1,400 students in the early 1990s, and many teachers were laid off. Despite the loss of population, however, Kenmore West continued to be recognized for its achievements. The Ken-Ton population continues to drop, and teachers and support staff continue to be laid off as the district economic climate changes. In the 2016–2017 school year, after the consolidation of Kenmore Middle School, Kenmore West now houses eighth graders as well as ninth, tenth, eleventh, and twelfth graders.

Academics 
In 2013, Kenmore West Senior High School was ranked 74th out of 135 Western New York high schools in terms of academic performance.

International Baccalaureate Program 
In January 2011, Kenmore West was designated as an International Baccalaureate (IB) School.  They were the second public school in Western New York with this distinction.  As of 2016, only two other high schools in Erie County offered the program: Kenmore East High School and City Honors School. By 2015, about 18% of Kenmore West students participate in the IB Diploma Program.

Notable alumni 
 Zach Anner, internet celebrity with cerebral palsy
 Wolf Blitzer, CNN journalist and author (who sent a video to the Class of 2009 graduation and visited Kenmore West on 4/9/10 to speak with the school)
 Jeff Czum, guitarist in the band Cute Is What We Aim For
 Frank H. Easterbrook, Chief Judge of the United States Court of Appeals for the Seventh Circuit
 Gregg Easterbrook, author and journalist
 Geoffrey Gatza, editor, publisher, poet
 Edward Gibson, Skylab astronaut (who spoke to the student body at the 2010 Homecoming rally)
 Green Jellÿ, musicians and theatrical group
 Beth Krom, two-term mayor of Irvine, California, and U.S. congressional candidate
 Dan McFall, NHL hockey player
 Jim McNally, former offensive line coach in the NCAA (1966–1979) and in the NFL (1980–2008)
 Gary McNamara Class of '73, former talk host at WGR and WBEN.  Nationally Syndicated Talk Host, "Red Eye Radio"
 Neal Smatresk, marine biologist, former president of the University of Nevada, Las Vegas (2009–2014), current president of the University of North Texas (2014–present)
 Bob Smith, comedian and author
 Richard Kermode, keyboardist who played with Janis Joplin, Malo, and Santana.
 Zachary Patton, class of 2009, designer and creative entrepreneur. Founder of Cretaceous Clothing, Bxllion Brands, Attractive Stranger and co-founder of software development company Atlas Digital Group.
 Kyle Sobon, USPA Powerlifter and NYS Men's raw Junior 18-19 82.5 kg squat record holder, World Record holder for most 100 pound conventional deadlifts in one minute

School colors and mascot 
The school's colors are royal blue and white, and the mascot is the Blue Devil. There are many different images used for the Blue Devil all throughout the school, and most have been designed by students. In recent years, the old mascot costume was replaced by a newer, more 'pumped-up' Blue Devil costume.

Athletics 
The Blue Devils compete in the Niagara Frontier League (NFL) in most sports. Exceptions include the football team which competes in the Class AA North division and the gymnastics team which competes in the Erie County Interscholastic Conference (ECIC) Division I. The school's sports teams have produced numerous championships throughout the school's 60-year history. The Blue Devils have a long-standing cross-town rivalry with Kenmore East High School. Sports offered are:

Basketball
 Boys' basketball
 1978: Advanced to the New York State Basketball Championship final game
 Girls' basketball

Football
 Voted #1 in New York by the New York State Sportswriters Association in 1969
 New York state champions: 1969
 Cited as "National Champions" in 1969 by a computer calculation operated by the Junior Super Bowl

Soccer
 Boys' soccer
 Girls' soccer

Track and field
 Cross country
 Indoor track

Tennis
 Boys' tennis
 Girls' tennis

Volleyball
 Boys' volleyball
 Girls' volleyball

 Other
 Golf
 Gymnastics
 Boys' Ice hockey
 Girls Ice Hockey
 Field hockey
 Rugby
 Softball
 New York state champions: 2002
 Girls and Boys Swimming
 Wrestling

Further reading 
 Settlement to Suburb: A History of the Town of Tonawanda, Erie County, New York 1607–1986, by Robert W. Silsby (1921–1912), Sterling C. Sommer Incorporated (1997); <div style="margin-left:2em">Silsby had been the history department chairman at Kenmore West High School
 The Town of Tonawanda, by John W. Percy, Images of America (series), Arcadia Publishing (1997); 
 Schoolbook: A Teacher's Memoir, by John E. Milner (born 1935) (self published) (1995); <div style="margin-left:2em">Milner, a 1953 graduate of Ken-West, taught English for 30 years there, from about 1960 to 1990; in May 2011, he was inducted into the Kenmore West High School "Corridor of Honor"

Notes

References

External links 
 
 Kenmore-Town of Tonawanda Union Free School District

Public high schools in New York (state)
High schools in Erie County, New York
1938 establishments in New York (state)
Educational institutions established in 1938